Shane is mainly a masculine given name. It is an anglicized version of the Irish name Seaghán/Seán, which itself is cognate to the name John. Shane comes from the way the name Seán is pronounced in the Ulster dialect of the Irish language, as opposed to Shaun or Shawn.

Shane is sometimes used as a feminine given name, from the Yiddish name Shayna, meaning "beautiful".

Shane is also a popular surname with the prefix "Mac", "Mc", or "O'", to form anglicized Irish surname patronyms. The surname was first recorded in Petty's census of Ireland (1659), which lists a Dermot McShane (i.e., Son of Shane).

Variant forms include O'Shane, O'Shea, Séamus, Seán or Sean, Shaine, Shauna, Shawna, Shay, Shayna, and Shayne.

The name Shane was popularized by Jack Schaefer's novel Shane (1949) and its eponymous 1953 movie adaptation, directed by George Stevens from a screenplay by A.B. Guthrie Jr.

Given name

Men
Shane, New Zealand singer
Shane Acker (born 1971), American filmmaker
Shane Aguirre (born 1972), American politician
Shane Alexander, 2nd Earl Alexander of Tunis (born 1935), British peer
Shane Austin (born 1989), American football player
Shane Baker, American politician
Shane Battelle (born 1971), American soccer player
Shane Battier (born 1978), American basketball player
Shane Beamer (born 1977), American football coach and former player
Shane Bergman (born 1990), Canadian football player
Shane Bieber (born 1995), American baseball player
Shane Bond (born 1970), New Zealand cricketer
Shane Briant (1946–2021), British-Australian actor and novelist
Shane Brolly (born 1970), Irish actor and writer
Shane Buechele (born 1998), American football player
Shane Byrne (born 1971), Irish rugby union player
Shane Cadogan (born 2001), Vincentian swimmer
Shane Carr, Irish Gaelic footballer
Shane Carruth (born 1972), American filmmaker
Shane Carwin (born 1975), American mixed martial artist
Shane Claiborne (born 1975), American Christian activist
Shane Clipfell (born 1963), American basketball player and coach
Shane Crawford (born 1974), Australian rules footballer
Shane Crosse (born 2001), Irish jockey
Shane Curran (disambiguation)
Shane Dawson (born 1988), American YouTube comedian and actor
Shane Doan (born 1976), Canadian ice hockey player
Shane Dorian (born 1972), American professional surfer
Shane Drumgold (born 1965), Australian lawyer
Shane Embury (born 1967), British bassist
Shane Filan (born 1979), Irish singer
Shane Forster (born 1972), Northern Ireland Anglican priest
Shane Garrett (born 1967), American football player
Shane Gillis (born 1987), American comedian
Shane Golobic (born 1991), American racing driver
Shane Grice (born 1976), American football player
Shane Harper (born 1993), American actor, singer, and dancer
Shane Heal (born 1970), Australian basketball player
Shane Henry (born 1970), American ice hockey player
Shane Horgan (born 1978), Irish rugby union player
Shane Jacobson (born 1970), Australian actor, director, writer, and comedian
Shane Jennings (born 2001), Irish rugby union player
Shane Kippel (born 1986), Canadian actor
Shane Lee (born 1973), Australian cricketer
Shane Lemieux (born 1997), American football player
Shane Leslie (1885–1971), Irish-born diplomat and writer
Shane Long (born 1987), Irish footballer
Shane Lynch (born 1971), Irish singer
Shane MacGowan (born 1957), Irish-English vocalist
Shane Fumani Marhanele (born 1982), South African basketball player
Shane Martin (disambiguation)
Shane Matthews (born 1970), American football player
Shane McConkey (1969–2009), American professional skier and BASE Jumper
Shane McDonald (born 1985), Australian basketball player
Shane McKenzie (born 1973), Australian bobsledder
Shane McMahon (born 1970), American professional wrestling executive and wrestler
Shane Meadows (born 1972), British film director
Shane Meehan (born 2002), Irish hurler
Shane Merritt (born 2000), Irish Gaelic footballer
Shane Murphy (disambiguation)
Shane Mosley (born 1971), American boxer
Shane Nicholson (disambiguation)
Shane Niemi (born 1978), Canadian track and field athlete
Shane O'Mara (disambiguation)
Shane O'Neill (disambiguation)
Shane O'Sullivan (disambiguation)
Shane Oblonsky (born 1985), Canadian kickboxer
Shane Owen (born 1990), Canadian ice hockey
Shane Pow (born 1990), Singaporean actor
Shane Richardson Reeves, 15th dean of the United States Military Academy
Shane Reynolds (born 1968), American baseball player
Shane Richie (born 1964), British actor and TV presenter
Shane Rimmer (1929-2019), Canadian actor and voice artist
Shane Roche, Gaelic footballer
Shane Ronayne (born 1979), Gaelic football manager
Shane Ryan (disambiguation)
Shane Sparks (born 1974), American hip-hop choreographer
Shane Stant (born 1971), the known assailant who attacked Nancy Kerrigan
Shane Stringer, American politician
Shane Sweetnam (born 1981), Irish equestrian
Shane Taylor (disambiguation)
Shane Thorne (born 1985), Australian wrestler
Shane Tilton (born 1978), American media scholar
Shane Tuck (1981–2020), Australian rules footballer
Shane Tutmarc (born 1981), American singer/songwriter/producer
Shane van Gisbergen (born 1989), New Zealand racing driver
Shane Victorino (born 1980), American baseball player
Shane Warne (1969–2022), Australian cricketer
Shane Watson (born 1981), Australian cricketer
Shane Webcke (born 1974), Australian rugby league footballer
Shane West (born 1978), American actor
Shane Williams (born 1977), Welsh rugby union player
Shane Wiskus (born 1998), American gymnast
Shane White (born 1970), American comic book artist
Shane Woewodin (born 1976), Australian football player
Shane Wright (disambiguation)
Shane Zylstra (born 1996), American football player

Women
Shane Bolks, American writer
Shane Collins (born 1963), New Zealand field hockey player
Shane de Silva (born 1972), West Indian cricket player
Shane Gould (born 1956), Australian swimmer

Fictional characters
 Shane, the eponymous hero of Jack Schaefer's novel (1949) and its 1953 film adaptation
 Shane, a marriageable NPC in the game Stardew Valley
 Shane-A112, a Spartan from the book Halo: Ghosts of Onyx
 Shane Barnstormer, the principal antagonist in the web series Video Game High School
Shane Botwin, principal character in the TV series Weeds
Shane Detorre, 10-year-old daughter of Frank Detorre in the movie Osmosis Jones
Shane Donovan, a character in the NBC daytime soap opera Days of Our Lives
Shane Dooiney, Locomotive Number 5 on the Culdee Fell Railway in The Railway Series by Wilbert Awdry
Shane Gooseman, from The Adventures of the Galaxy Rangers
Shane McCutcheon, from The L Word
Shane Omen, a character in the film Mean Girls
Shane Parrish, a character in the Australian soap opera Home and Away
 Captain Shane Schofield, central character in Matthew Reilly's novels Ice Station, Area 7, Scarecrow, Scarecrow and the Army of Thieves, and the novella Hell Island
 Shane Vansen, in the TV series Space: Above and Beyond
Shane Vendrell, a detective on the police drama television series The Shield
Shane Walsh in The Walking Dead comic series
Shane Wolfe, the protagonist of the 2005 Disney action comedy film The Pacifier

Surname

Shane Twins (born 1967), twin brothers Mike and Todd Shane, professional wrestlers
Alex Shane (born 1979), British former wrestler
Bob Shane (1934–2020), American singer and guitarist, founding member of The Kingston Trio
C. Donald Shane (1895–1983), American astronomer
Doug Shane, president of The Spaceship Company and Scaled Composites, and test pilot
Elvie Shane (born 1988), American country music singer
Jackie Shane (1940–2019), American soul and R&B singer and transgender pioneer
John Shane (1822–1899), American politician, judge, and military officer
Paul Shane (1940–2013), English actor
Peter M. Shane (born 1952), American law professor
Rita Shane (1936–2014), American operatic soprano
Tom Shane, founder of the Shane Company
William Rodger Shane (1935–2012), American politician

See also
MacShane, a surname
McShane (name)
Shain (disambiguation), surname with the same pronunciation
Shayne (name)
Sheen (disambiguation), name with a similar pronunciation

References

English masculine given names
English unisex given names
Irish masculine given names
Irish unisex given names